Abezhdan District is a district (bakhsh) in Andika County, Khuzestan Province, Iran. At the 2006 census, its population was 21,972, in 4,028 families.  The district has one city Abezhdan.  The district has two rural districts (dehestan): Abezhdan Rural District and Kushk Rural District.

References 

Andika County

Districts of Khuzestan Province